Ishqiya is a 2020 Pakistani television series premiered on ARY Digital.  It is produced by Fahad Mustafa and Dr. Ali Kazmi under Big Bang Entertainment. It is a story of love, trust and betrayal which revolves around main  characters, Hamza, Rumaisa and Hamna, played by Feroze Khan, Hania Aamir and Ramsha Khan respectively.  The series was aired on 3 February to 10 August 2020.

It will also air in Arab World on MBC Bollywood in Ramadan 2021. Serial won 8 awards out of 17 nominations at ARY People Choice Awards 2020.

Plot 
Hamna(Ramsha Khan) and Rumaisa(Hania Amir) are sisters raised by protective parents. Hamna is quiet, calm and reserved while Rumi is carefree, outgoing and talkative, but both love their father dearly. Hamna and her college classmate, Hamza have been dating for four years and are madly in love with each other. Hamza is rather possessive about her as well, violently so. Hamna is hesitant to tell her father about him as he doesn't believe in love marriages. Due to her father's sickness and fear of him losing his respect, Hamna gets married to her father's friend's son Azeem on his insistence. She hides this from Hamza and avoids him for a while. When Hamza finally finds out, he screams at Hamna in front of everyone in their university. Heartbroken and betrayed, Hamza  meets with a car accident and is severely injured. Hamna prays for his recovery and he survives.

After regaining consciousness, Hamza vows to take revenge. He soon reaches Hamna's house with his parents to ask for Rumi's hand in marriage. Hamna is shocked by this and is strictly against this marriage. She tries to stop everyone but fails as Hamza blackmails using all her messages and videos in which she is expressing her love for him. Hamza manages to get married to Rumi, and the couples have a common reception. On the side, Alishba, Hamza's mother's partner's daughter who was in love with him, is extremely heartbroken and jealous. Rumi finds Hamza cute and is happy with the marriage. 
After the marriages, Hamza begins calling Hamna often, sometimes to make her feel guilty for what she did, and sometimes to scare her by saying that he will mistreat Rumi. Due to continuous hushed calls and Hamna's distant and distracted behaviour, Azeem gets suspicious but does not question Hamna. Due to Rumi's carefree and lively nature, Hamza starts falling for her but does not realize it. He starts to enjoy spending time with her and she brings him joy like he has never known. Also, with Rumi being possessive of him, he begins to realize that him and Rumi has much more similarities than him and Hamna. 

On Rumi's insistence, Hamza joins his father's business. As a part of revenge, Hamza gifts Azeem and Hamna honeymoon tickets and both the couples go on their honeymoon together. There Hamza continues to blackmail Hamna and beats a man  up for staring at her. This makes Azeem more suspicious. Siddique Sahab (Hamna and Rumi's father) falls severely ill and is admitted to hospital but no one is aware of it except their mother. Alishba, who still has feelings for Hamza, begins to notice Hamza staring at Hamna and digs up their past and reaches their university to collect proof. As Rumi is more attached to her father, she immediately realises that something is wrong and asks Hamza to return. Once home, she becomes furious at her mother for not informing her about her father's illness.
Hamna confesses to Azeem about Hamza and her past, and while he feels betrayed , he vows to protect her.

Siddiqui Sahab passes away and Rumi is shattered and feels betrayed for not being able to help him. Azeem continues to behave coldly with Hamna but does not reveal to anyone about her past and the truth. When Hamza comforts Rumi after her father's death, she asks him whether he loves her to which he nods. Rumi asks him not to give her any false hopes and always remember that she too loves him. Rumi being unaware of his motive behind marrying her, advises Hamza not to become selfish in love and value others love as well, Hamza hugs her and his senses become overshadowed by her. He confesses same to his confidant, Shariq, that Rumi's tears make him uneasy and her happiness and well-being matters to him the most. Shariq says he has fallen in love with her which Hamza denies saying he has no place for love in his heart. Shariq tells him that Allah is much greater than his power of revenge and Allah has supported his love for Rumi. He advises him to give up on his revenge and accept his defeat (as he is in love with Rumaisa).

Azeem warns Hamza of coming near Hamna and consequences of his doings. Hamza, having accepted his love for Rumi, asks Hamna to end this game and that he has deleted all her messages. When Hamna thinks it is his fear speaking, Hamza reveals that he is in love with Rumi. Hamna does not believe him and asks him to tell her the truth, if he really loves her, to which he agrees. 
When Hamza goes home to tell Rumi the truth,  she tells Hamza that she is pregnant. Hamza requests Azeem not to reveal the truth to Rumi because of her pregnancy. Azeem and Hamna agree to do the same.
Everything seems to be going right. But right on Rumi's baby shower
Alishba tells her the truth about Hamza and Hamna. Rumi slaps her but still has a doubt.

Next day, she goes to Hamna's house and on being asked, Hamna tells her the truth. Rumi goes back to her in-laws house and starts packing. When Hamza asks her where she is going, Rumi confronts him. She says that she realises that she was only his revenge and that their love was a lie. Hamza tries to explain but Rumi slaps him and tells him not to touch her. She goes back to her mother's house and is devastated. Hamna comes and tells her that Hamza was blackmailing her not to tell Rumi anything. Rumi tells the truth to her in-laws and her mother also hears about it. Hamza's family is ashamed and angry at his actions. Hamza tries to tell Rumi that he loves her but she tells him that he only loves himself. Rumi asks him to blackmail her and show her love messages to everyone not caring that she is his wife. Because he didn't care that Hamna is someone's sister, daughter and a wife. Due to weakness she has a miscarriage, this breaks Rumi a lot. However, she pulls herself together and forgives her mother. Azeem and Rumi forgive Hamna and Rumi files for divorce. In the end Hamna gets pregnant and Rumi is shown living a happy independent life with her mother.  
Hamza is shown to be sitting alone with toys he bought for his unborn child all around him, seemingly broken and depressed.

Cast

Soundtrack

The original soundtrack is sung and composed by Asim Azhar. Lyrics were written by Azhar himself along with Hassan Ali and Raamis. It received more than 17 million views on YouTube. The female version which is played within episodes and sometimes at the end is sung by Kaiynat John.

Awards and nominations

References

External links 
Official website

ARY Digital original programming
Pakistani romantic drama television series
2020 Pakistani television series debuts
2020s Pakistani television series